The 2000 Junior Pan American Rhythmic Gymnastics Championships was held in San Felipe, Venezuela, October 9–15, 2000.

Medal summary

References

2000 in gymnastics
Pan American Gymnastics Championships
International gymnastics competitions hosted by Venezuela